Mario Falcone is a fictional character appearing in American comic books published by DC Comics. He is the son of Gotham City mob boss Carmine Falcone, the brother of Alberto Falcone and Sofia Falcone, and the uncle of Kitrina Falcone.

The character appeared on the third season of Gotham portrayed by James Carpinello while another version appeared in the third season of the Arrowverse series Batwoman portrayed by Marcio Barauna.

Publication history
Mario Falcone first appeared in Batman: Dark Victory #1 and was created by Jeph Loeb and Tim Sale.

Fictional character biography
At some point after Carmine Falcone is murdered by Two-Face, Mario and Sofia visited their father's grave, giving him a posthumous birthday party with their cousin Lucia Vitti, Selina Kyle, and other high-profile Mafiosi in attendance. Batman surveils the party from a rooftop until a gangster took notice and attacks him. Catwoman helps Batman take the thugs down. By the time Lieutenant James Gordon and the police arrive, Mario and the rest of Falcone family have already fled. Later on at Wayne Manor, Mario visits Bruce Wayne and proposes a business alliance between the Falcone family and Wayne Enterprises. Bruce declines, earning Mario's displeasure.

Mario later summons Gordon and District Attorney Janice Porter to his father's gravesite, stating that his father's corpse was stolen from its grave. Sofia, Angelo Mirti, and some private investigators interrupt the meeting. During the Christmas season, Mario tells Gordon and Porter that Sofia will be out for his blood. Mario later meets with Sofia and Alberto, and claims that their father is still alive. Unbeknownst to him, Calendar Man has been impersonating Carmine in an effort to drive Mario and Alberto insane.

Sal Maroni's crime family begins robbing Falcone Imports, with help from Vitti and small-time smuggler Tony Zucco. Mario tells Sofia that her assets are being frozen and threatens to disown her if she cannot put a stop to the robberies. After Sofia's departure, Mario speaks with an unknown figure who states that she will now go to the only place that would take her in. When Mario states that he doesn't want his name associated with the contact, the unknown figure states that nobody is interested in him.

On Mother's Day, Mario meets with Gotham City's bankers and Bruce Wayne, but the meeting is interrupted when the Joker attacks them. The Joker then kidnaps Mario and his siblings and holds them hostage at Gotham City Police Department headquarters. Batman saves the Falcone siblings and hands them over to the police, but the trial judge secures their release.

On Columbus Day, Two-Face's gang attacks and kills all the Falcone Crime Family members, except for Mario, Alberto, and Sofia. Mario later speaks with Gordon and Officer Julia Lopez about the deal that he made with Porter about the information revolving around Sofia's movements in exchange for protection. The Hangman Killer then murders Alberto and Sofia, leaving Mario as the sole surviving member of the Falcone family. Alone and despondent, Mario sets fire to the Falcone family mansion.

Kyle later discovers that Mario has set up shop in the unincorporated part of Gotham City. Mario's niece Kitrina keeps quiet about Catwoman fleeing the grounds of the Falcone Manor.

During a fight with Robin, Mario threatens to kill Two-Face's estranged wife Gilda. Two-Face comes to Gilda's defense and shoots Mario three times, killing him.

In other media
Mario Calvi appears in Season 3 of Gotham, portrayed by James Carpinello. While he loves and respects his father, Don Carmine Falcone, he is not involved in the Falcone crime family, and makes an honest living as a doctor. He has also forsaken the Falcone family name, using instead his mother's maiden name, Calvi. Debuting in "Look Into My Eyes", Mario moves to Gotham City with his fiancée, Leslie Thompkins, and gets a job at Gotham City Hospital. When Leslie's ex-boyfriend Jim Gordon turns up the emergency room, Mario tends to his wounds. Later on, Mario and Leslie meet with Carmine at a restaurant, where he gives them his blessing. Mario helps Gordon in rescuing Leslie and Gordon's girlfriend Valerie Vale from Jervis Tetch and Tweedledum and Tweedledee. Gordon tells Tetch to shoot Leslie, knowing that he won't. Sure enough, Tetch shoots Vale instead, but Mario is still angered that Gordon put Leslie in danger. Mario operates upon Vale saving her life and later helps to cure Gordon of the effects of a psychedelic toxin Tetch had infected him with. In "Time Bomb", the Court of Owls tries to kill Mario in order to bring his father to heel. Mario kills one of the assassins in a fit of rage. It is revealed that he been infected with Tetch's toxin. By the end of the episode, Mario sees Leslie leaving Gordon's apartment and suspects her of infidelity; he flies into a rage and kills a mugger who tries to rob him. Gordon suspects Mario of being infected and arrests him to protect Leslie. Lucius Fox tests Mario's blood and finds that it shows no sign of infection, forcing Gordon to let Mario go. Mario proceeds to marry Leslie. Fox and Harvey Bullock later find that Mario took some chemical to conceal the infection within him and tells Gordon. Gordon soon learns that he and Leslie are at his lake house. Mario tries to stab Leslie to death, but Gordon arrives just in time and guns him down in self-defense. Carmine Falcone and Leslie Thompkins attend Mario Calvi's funeral in the following episode. In "All Will Be Judged", Mario Calvi appears in Leslie Thompkins's dream where he claimed that he wasn't jealous of Gordon. Leslie's dream ended with Mario telling Leslie to drink in a distorted voice.
 Mario Falcone appears in the Batwoman episode "We're All Mad Here", portrayed by Marcio Barauna. This version is a member of Black Glove. He and the other members of Black Glove are kidnapped by Marquis Jet where he kills Falcone offscreen.

References

External links
 Mario Falcone at DC Comics Wiki
 Mario Falcone at Comic Vine

DC Comics male characters
DC Comics television characters
Fictional gangsters
Fictional Italian American people
Comics characters introduced in 1999
Fictional physicians
Fictional murdered people